Crookes is a lunar impact crater that lies on the Moon's far side as seen from the Earth. It lies just to the southwest of the giant crater Korolev. To the southwest of Crookes is McKellar.

The rim of this crater has a relatively high albedo compared to most such formations on the Moon, and it lies at the center of a ray system. This ejecta forms a nearly continuous blanket out to at least one crater diameter before forming extended rays and a multitude of wispy markings across the surface. The ray system continues for several hundred kilometers, including extending across a substantial portion of the Korolev basin.  Due to these prominent rays, Crookes is mapped as part of the Copernican System.

As would be expected for a relatively young crater, Crookes has a sharp-edged rim that has not been significantly eroded. The inner walls are relatively wide, and have slumped inward along the edges. Offset slightly to the east of the midpoint of the crater is a small central peak on the interior floor.

Satellite craters
By convention these features are identified on lunar maps by placing the letter on the side of the crater midpoint that is closest to Crookes.

References

 
 
 
 
 
 
 
 
 
 
 
 

Impact craters on the Moon